Virbia minuta is a moth in the family Erebidae. It was described by Felder in 1874. It is found in Amazonas in Brazil and in Mexico.

References

Moths described in 1874
minuta